O Santo Mestiço is a Brazilian telenovela produced and broadcast by TV Globo. It premiered on 12 February 1966 and ended on 7 June 1966, with a total of 80 episodes. It's the fourth "novela das sete" to be aired at the timeslot. It is created by Glória Magadan and directed by Fábio Sabag.

Cast

References

External links 
 

1968 telenovelas
Brazilian telenovelas
1968 Brazilian television series debuts
1968 Brazilian television series endings
TV Globo telenovelas
Portuguese-language telenovelas